Cleethorpes is a town in North East Lincolnshire, England.

Cleethorpes may refer to:

Cleethorpes (borough)
 Cleethorpes (UK Parliament constituency)